Haiti competed at the 2020 Winter Youth Olympics in Lausanne, Switzerland from 9 to 22 January 2020. 

Haiti made its Winter Youth Olympics debut, as its team consisted of one male alpine skier.

Alpine skiing

Boys

See also
Haiti at the 2020 Summer Olympics

References

2020 in Haitian sport
Nations at the 2020 Winter Youth Olympics
Haiti at the Youth Olympics